Maziwi island (Kisiwa cha Maziwi in Swahili) is a  unvegetated island surrounded by coral reefs located about  south east of the town of Pangani off the northern coast of  Tanga Region in Tanzania. The island is administered under  Mwera ward of Pangani District.  It became a nature reserve in 1975. At one time the island was larger than its present area and was well-vegetated but with the loss of its palm trees and scrub cover, it has suffered erosion and is now sometimes completely immersed at the time of the highest tides.  Green sea turtles no longer nest on the island, but it is visited by numerous sea birds. The sea contains many species of coral and over two hundred species of fish. The reserve has received little active conservation work but management is now supported by levying a small fee on tourists which is used to compensate local fishermen for loss of income.

History
Historical records indicate that this island used to be significantly larger and was vegetated with palm trees and other shrubs. Due to local fishermen cutting trees on the island possibly in combination with sea level rise, changing current or weather patterns, and tourist use of the island to snorkel or dive from, the island has experienced significant erosion.

Flora and fauna

There is a wide diversity of marine species found in and around the island reserves. This includes over 200 species of fish, 35 species of corals, many types of birds and a number of different sea grasses, algae and sponges. The island is also home to an endemic shrimp species named Tectopontonia maziwiae.   
The island used to be a nesting site for endangered green sea turtles. However, their eggs must be deposited above the high tide water line to survive and the entire island is covered with water at certain points because of the severe erosion. While no longer a nesting habitat, sea turtles are still commonly sighted in the surrounding reef.

Conservation
Maziwe reef was set aside as a 'no use' conservation zone under the Pangani/Ushongo Community Conservation Program in 1994.
Despite this little had changed with the actual management and use of the reef until recent effort from partners of the Dorobo Fund and community partners, notably local fishermen and tourist resorts known as Warafiki wa Maziwe (Friends of Maziwe).  Under this program tourists are charged a small fee which goes to reimburse local fisherman for patrolling the reef and not fishing there.  While monitoring programs are underway, the effects of this protection are currently unknown.

References

1975 establishments in Tanzania
Geography of Tanga Region
IUCN Category II
Marine reserves of Tanzania
Protected areas established in 1975
Uninhabited islands of Tanzania
East African coral coast